David Omar Rodríguez Barrera (born 27 January 1989), commonly known as Deivid, is a Spanish footballer who plays as a central defender for UD Villa de Santa Brígida.

Club career
Born in Las Palmas, Canary Islands, Deivid came through the youth ranks at his hometown club UD Las Palmas, but made his professional debut with neighbouring Universidad de Las Palmas CF, playing two seasons in the Segunda División B. In July 2010 he joined Sevilla FC, being assigned to the reserves in the same league.

Deivid played his first match in La Liga on 2 April 2012, coming off the bench for Álvaro Negredo in the dying minutes of a 3–1 home win against RCD Mallorca. He added a further four first-team appearances, being released by the Andalusians at the end of the campaign as his contract was not renewed.

On 4 July 2012, Deivid signed a two-year contract with UD Las Palmas, returning to his native region. On 28 June 2014 he moved to Córdoba CF, newly promoted to the top tier.

On 12 July 2017, Deivid agreed to a two-year deal with Real Valladolid in the Segunda División. The following 1 July, after achieving promotion to the top flight (appearing in all but two matches early into the season but also missing several months in the final stretch due to a quadriceps injury), he returned to Las Palmas on a three-year contract.

Deivid was loaned to Nea Salamis Famagusta FC of the Cypriot First Division on 29 January 2020, for five months. He was subsequently released by his parent club.

In August 2020, Deivid signed with amateurs CD Atlético Paso. In late September 2021, following a street brawl involving himself and several of his teammates, the 32-year-old was fired.

References

External links

1989 births
Living people
Spanish footballers
Footballers from Las Palmas
Association football defenders
La Liga players
Segunda División players
Segunda División B players
Tercera División players
Tercera Federación players
Universidad de Las Palmas CF footballers
Sevilla Atlético players
Sevilla FC players
UD Las Palmas players
Córdoba CF players
Real Valladolid players
Cypriot First Division players
Nea Salamis Famagusta FC players
Spanish expatriate footballers
Expatriate footballers in Cyprus
Spanish expatriate sportspeople in Cyprus